Krystyna Nowakowska (8 December 1935 – 15 November 2019) was a Polish female athlete. She represented Poland at the 1960 Summer Olympics in the 800 metres event. She also competed at the 1958 European Athletics Championships competing in 800 metres event and at the 1962 European Athletics Championships competing in the Women's 800 metres event.

See also 
 Poland at the 1960 Summer Olympics

References 

1935 births
2019 deaths
Olympic athletes of Poland
Polish female middle-distance runners
Athletes (track and field) at the 1960 Summer Olympics
People from Ostrowiec County
Sportspeople from Świętokrzyskie Voivodeship
20th-century Polish women
21st-century Polish women